The 27th Field Artillery Regiment, Royal Canadian Artillery was a Canadian Army Reserve artillery regiment based in Farnham, Quebec. The regiment was reduced to nil strength in 1970 and placed on the Supplementary Order of Battle.

Origin 
The regiment was originally the Eastern Townships Mounted Rifles, a militia/reserve cavalry regiment which was first authorized in 1910. In 1936, as part of the 1936 Canadian Militia reorganization, the regiment was converted from cavalry to artillery.

Lineage 
 Originated on 1 April 1910, in Coaticook, Quebec, as the 26th Canadian Horse (Stanstead Dragoons).
Redesignated on 3 September 1912, as the 26th Stanstead Dragoons.
Redesignated on 15 March 1920, as The Eastern Townships Mounted Rifles.
Converted from cavalry to artillery regiment on 15 December 1936,and redesignated as the 27th Field Brigade, RCA.
 Redesignated on 7 November 1940, as the 27th (Reserve) Field Brigade, RCA.
 Redesignated on 1 March 1943, as the 27th (Reserve) Field Regiment.
 Redesignated on 15 October 1943, as the 27th Field Regiment, RCA.
 Redesignated on 12 April 1960, as the 27th Field Artillery Regiment, RCA.
 Reduced to nil strength 1 April 1970, and transferred to the Supplementary Order of Battle.

Allocated batteries 
27th Field Artillery Regiment, RCA (15 December 1936)

 Regimental Headquarters (Coaticook, Quebec)
 72nd Field Battery, RCA   (Coaticook)
 73rd Field Battery (Howitzer), RCA (Magog)
 74th Field Battery, RCA (Stanstead)
 75th Field Battery, RCA  (Cowansville)

References

Field artillery regiments of Canada
1936 establishments in Canada
1970 disestablishments in Canada
Supplementary Order of Battle
Organizations based in Quebec
Military units and formations disestablished in 1970